Karl August, Hereditary Grand Duke of Saxe-Weimar-Eisenach (31 July 1844 – 20 November 1894) was a German prince and Hereditary Grand Duke (Erbgroßherzog) of Saxe-Weimar-Eisenach.

Biography
Born in Weimar, Karl was the only son of Karl Alexander, Grand Duke of Saxe-Weimar-Eisenach and Princess Sophie of the Netherlands. He would serve in the army of the Grand Duchy of Saxony (Saxe-Weimar-Eisenach) and he was present when Wilhelm I was crowned as German emperor.

Because his mother was a daughter of King William II of the Netherlands and his older uncles, except King William III, died childless, Karl August was second in line in the succession to the throne of the Netherlands from 1890 to 1894. He was preceded only by his mother. This was the reason for him learning to write and speak fluent Dutch, due to the possibility of Karl August becoming king if his cousin Queen Wilhelmina of the Netherlands died without issue.

In leisure, Karl dedicated himself to his copperplate collection and coin cabinet. He was also interested in the Grand Ducal Library and the newly built archive, where he often studied historical documents on the history of the house. His popularity and his uncomplicated outreach to the residents of the Grand Duchy made him a beloved leader of the duchy.

Karl August died at Cap Martin, France, six years before his father; because of this, his eldest son Wilhelm Ernst succeeded his grandfather as Grand Duke. Karl August is buried in the Weimar royal crypt.

Family and children
In Friedrichshafen on 26 August 1873 Karl August married Princess Pauline of Saxe-Weimar-Eisenach. They were second cousins, as she was the paternal granddaughter of Prince Bernhard, who had been in the service of the king of the Netherlands and was a younger brother of the Grand Duke Karl Frederick of Saxe-Weimar-Eisenach, the grandfather of Karl August. Her maternal grandparents were William I of Württemberg and his third wife Pauline Therese.

Karl August and Pauline had two sons:
Wilhelm Ernst Karl Alexander Friedrich Heinrich Bernhard Albert Georg Hermann, Grand Duke of Saxe-Weimar-Eisenach (b. Weimar, 10 June 1876 – d. Heinrichau, 24 April 1923).
Bernhard Karl Alexander Hermann Heinrich Wilhelm Oscar Friedrich Franz Peter (b. Weimar, 18 April 1878 – d. Weimar, 1 October 1900).

Honours
He received the following awards:

Ancestry

References

1844 births
1894 deaths
Princes of Saxe-Weimar-Eisenach
Heirs apparent who never acceded
Nobility from Weimar
Hereditary Grand Dukes of Saxe-Weimar-Eisenach
Recipients of the Grand Cross of the Iron Cross
Recipients of the Order of the Netherlands Lion
Knights Third Class of the Military Order of William
Recipients of the Order of St. George of the Fourth Degree
Grand Crosses of the Order of Saint Stephen of Hungary
Sons of monarchs